Attenborough in Paradise is a BBC television documentary written and presented by David Attenborough. It was first transmitted in 1996 and is part of the Attenborough in Paradise and Other Personal Voyages collection of seven documentaries.

In this program Attenborough fulfills a childhood ambition, developed after reading a book as a nine-year-old, to see the greater bird-of-paradise in display; and records the spectacular birdlife of the New Guinea forest, in particular the various birds-of-paradise.

In 2015, the BBC released a new episode of the series shot at a Sheikh's private aviary in Qatar.

Quotes

In the final piece to camera for this documentary David Attenborough introduces quotes from the 1869 book The Malay Archipelago by Alfred Russel Wallace.
 
53 min 15 sec

References

From DVD

External links

BBC television documentaries
Nature educational television series